The ABU Radio Song Festival is a biennial non-competitive gala that showcases songs or instrumentals by musicians across Asia, organised by the Asia-Pacific Broadcasting Union (ABU), and is based on the Eurovision Song Contest. The format consists of a non-televised semi-final and grand final which is broadcast.

Participating countries which have full or additional full ABU membership are invited to submit a song from an act that is unsigned to any record label. These entries are listened to by a panel of jury members, who select fifteen to proceed towards the radio festival final, were another panel of judges determining the top-5 prize winners. The grand final may be broadcast live via radio and television, or as a delayed live recorded broadcast for national broadcasters who may wish to add subtitles in their native languages.

Development

The Asia-Pacific Broadcasting Union (ABU) had already run an international song contest for its members inspired by the Eurovision Song Contest in 1985 – 1987, called the ABU Popular Song Contest, with 14 countries of the Asia-Pacific region competing. The show had a similar concept to the current radio song festival with winners being chosen by a professional jury. South Korea, New Zealand and Australia celebrated victories in this competition. In 1989 – 1991 ABU co-produced the ABU Golden Kite World Song Festival in Malaysia with participation of Asia-Pacific countries, as well as Yugoslavia and Finland.

Shortly before launching the ABU Song Festival, the ABU had been considering the possibility to organize the ABU ASEAN TV Song Festival in Thailand. Historically, ASEAN song contests had been organized in periods between 1981 and 1997, however since 2011 the ASEAN Festival had been organized between local Radio stations as Bintang Radio ASEAN.  The ABU outlined a plan about a "television song festival" based on the style of the Eurovision Song Contest following the cancellation of Our Sound. Kenny Kihyung Bae, chosen to the project manager, attended Eurovision Song Contest 2012 in Baku, Azerbaijan to learn more about the contest before putting it to work.

In November 2011, the ABU announced that they would organize its own TV and Radio Song Festivals to take place in Seoul, the South Korean capital, in time with 49th General Assembly in October 2012. The name Asiavision Song Contest was initially mentioned as a possibility, but they were later officially titled ABU TV Song Festival and ABU Radio Song Festival. According to the ABU, the deadline for participation applications for ABU TV Song Festival 2012 was 18 May 2012.

Format
The ABU Radio Song Festival is a concert performance for musicians, who are not under contract with any label. The ABU recommends its members to introduce participating musicians and their songs on radio. Every participant is chosen by one national radio broadcaster. A jury represented by ABU members chooses 15 finalists from 26 submissions. The finalists perform during the general assembly of the ABU. Another jury awards the best artists.

Participation

Participation in the contest is open to members of the Asia-Pacific Broadcasting Union.
Table key

Hosting

Notes and references

Notes

References

External links 
 ABU Radio Song Festival website

Song contests
 
Music festivals established in 2012

de:ABU Song Festivals#ABU Radio Song Festival
es:Festivales de la Canción de la UAR#Festival Radiofónico de la Canción de la UAR
fr:Festivals ABU de la chanson#Festival Radio ABU de la chanson
ru:Азиатско-Тихоокеанские фестивали песни#Азиатско-Тихоокеанский радиофестиваль песни
szl:Festy pjosynki ABU#Fest radyjny pjosynki ABU